The Royal Moroccan Football Federation, is the governing body of football in Morocco. It was established in 1956. It became a member in the FIFA in 1960, and in the same year it also became a member in the CAF association. It organizes the football league, the Botola, the Morocco national football team and the Morocco women's national football team. It is based in Rabat. it is also a member of the UAFA and UNAF.

History

Africa Cup Of Nations 
On 29 January 2011, the CAF Board decided that Morocco would host the 2015 Africa Cup of Nations, while the 2017 edition would be held in South Africa.

In October 2014, the government of Morocco requested a postponement of the tournament due to the Ebola virus epidemic in West Africa. After the matter was discussed at the executive committee meeting on 2 November 2014, CAF decided to keep the date of the tournament, while also asking for a clarification from the Royal Moroccan Football Federation of whether they still wish to host the tournament. On 8 November, Morocco failed to meet this deadline to confirm it would host the tournament. Three days later CAF confirmed that Morocco would not host the tournament and a new host would be chosen from a list of countries which have expressed interest. Morocco, who had previously qualified as hosts, were disqualified from participation at the tournament.

On 1 October 2022, Morocco announced its willingness to host the 2025 Africa Cup of Nations, after it was stripped from Guinea.

Women's Africa Cup of Nations 
On 15 January 2021, Morocco was announced as hosts for the 2022 Women's Africa Cup of Nations. This is the first time a North African Arab country has hosted the Women's Africa Cup of Nations. After a successful event, Morocco was given the right to host the 2024 Women's Africa Cup of Nations.

FIFA World Cup Bids 
In 1994, Morocco, United States and Brazil bade to host the 1994 FIFA World Cup. The United States eventually won the bid with 10 votes, Morocco in second place with 7 votes and Brazil with 2. Morocco was set to bid on the upcoming 1998 FIFA World Cup. It ended with 12-7 vote for France allowing France to be host of the 16th edition of the FIFA World Cup.

In 2006, Morocco made their third bid to host the FIFA World Cup. Germany was successful in winning the vote to host the 2006 FIFA World Cup. Morocco continued its attempt to host the next FIFA World Cup edition but failed in doing so. South Africa won the bid making it the first African country to host the World Cup. On 6 June 2015, The Daily Telegraph reported that Morocco had actually won the vote, but South Africa was awarded the tournament instead.

2026 FIFA World Cup 

On 11 August 2017, was set for submission of an intention to bid, and on that day, the Royal Moroccan Football Federation announced that it would submit a bid for the 2026 FIFA World Cup. In March 2018, the Morocco 2026 bid committee stated their plan to spend $16 billion on preparing for the tournament, including building new transportation infrastructure, 21 new hospitals, a large number of new hotels and leisure facilities and building and/or renovating new stadiums.

2030 FIFA World Cup 

The national football association of Morocco is scheduled to bid to host the 2030 FIFA World Cup. On 15 June 2018, The bid was led by the Royal Moroccan Football Federation, who officially confirmed it.

On 25 July 2018, Royal Moroccan Football Federation president Fouzi Lekjaa, confirmed Morocco will apply for the 2030 World Cup bid. On 10 March 2023, The Royal Spanish Football Federation and the Portuguese Football Federation, were studying the possibility of adding Morocco to their Iberian Bid to host the 2030 World Cup replacing Ukraine.

Record of the Moroccan national team 
World Cup
 6 participations : 1970, 1986, 1994 1998, 2018, 2022
 Second Round : 1986.
 4th Place : 2022.
Africa cup
 Winners : 1976.
 2nd place : 2004.
 3rd place : 1980.
 4th place : 1986, 1988.
 Quarter final : 1998, 2017, 2021.
African Nations Championship
 Winner : 2018, 2020
Arab Cup
 Winner : 2012

Youth and Olympic teams

 Africa U-20 Cup of Nations
Champions: 1997

 UNAF U-20 Tournament
Champions: 2015, 2020

 Arab Cup U-20
Champions: 2011

 Mediterranean Games 
Champions: 1983, 2013

 Jeux de la Francophonie
Champions: 2001, 2017
 Islamic Solidarity Games
Champions: 2013
Runners-Up: 2005
 Pan Arab Games 
Champions: 1961, 1985

 UNAF U-17 Tournament
Champions: 2007, 2011, 2018

Presidents
FIFA rejected an election in 2013, and demanded a new election in 2014. A term generally lasts four years.

References

External links
  Official website
 Morocco at the FIFA website.
 Morocco at CAF Online

Morocco
Football in Morocco
Maroc
Football
Sports organizations established in 1956
1956 establishments in Morocco